Anthea M. Hartig (born 1964) is an American historian and museum administrator who is the director of the Smithsonian Institution National Museum of American History in Washington, D.C. The Smithsonian trustees appointed Hartig as director beginning in 2019, succeeding John Gray. She is the museum's first female director.

With a background in historic preservation and museums, Hartig was earlier the director of the California Historical Society.

Early life and career
Hartig was born in 1964 into a family with a long history in California. Her great-grandfather was a sheep rancher near Chino, California, and her grandfather and father both lived in the Pomona Valley in Southern California. Her mother's family, however, is largely based in Rhode Island. Hartig was raised in Rancho Cucamonga in San Bernardino County, California, where she attended and graduated from the local public school system.

Hartig received a bachelor's degree in history from the University of California, Los Angeles, and spent part of her undergraduate career studying at the College of William & Mary in Williamsburg, Virginia. She received her master's degree in public history from the University of California, Riverside in 1989 and her Ph.D. in American architectural history and material culture studies from UC-Riverside in 2001.

Hartig worked as a municipal preservation planner for more than 10 years, serving for a time as Senior Planner with the city of Riverside, California. She also founded her own preservation consulting firm.

Dr. Hartig was an assistant professor of history at La Sierra University from 2000 to 2005, teaching history and cultural studies. She also taught graduate courses in historic preservation at UC-Riverside. From 2001 to 2005, she also served as chair of the California State Historic Resources Commission.

Preservation career
In 2005, Hartig was appointed director of the Western Office of the National Trust for Historic Preservation. This was not only the Trust's largest geographic region but also its most architecturally, culturally, and historically diverse.

After six years with the National Trust, Hartig was named executive director and chief executive officer of the California Historical Society (CHS). CHS was struggling as an organization and museum. During Hartig's tenure, she raised $20 million in a capital fundraising campaign, launched the organization's first digital library, and significantly raised attendance at CHS museum exhibits from a few thousand to more than 100,000. She won funding from the state of California, which had not contributed to the organization before, and quadrupled the CHS annual operating budget to $5.2 million.

National Museum of American History
On December 12, 2018, the Smithsonian Institution announced it had appointed Hartig as the director of the National Museum of American History, succeeding six-year incumbent John Gray. She is the first woman to hold this position at the museum.

Other roles and honors
Hartig has served on the board of directors of a wide range of local, state, and national history and historic preservation organizations, including the California Council for the Promotion of History and the California Preservation Foundation. As of 2018, she also served as a cultural resources specialist for the California State Park and Recreation Commission.

Dr. Hartig has authored several books and a number of articles in academic and professional journals.

Hartig received the 2011 California Preservationist of the Year Award from the California Preservation Foundation in recognition of her contribution to the cause of historic preservation in California.

Personal life
Hartig is married to John A. Swiecki, principal planner for the city of Brisbane, California. The couple has two college-age sons.

References

1964 births
Living people
Directors of museums in the United States
Women museum directors
Smithsonian Institution people
People from Rancho Cucamonga, California
University of California, Los Angeles alumni
University of California, Riverside alumni
La Sierra University faculty
Historical preservationists
University of California, Riverside faculty